Snowball is a 1995 Italian adventure-comedy film written and directed by Maurizio Nichetti.

Cast 
 Paolo Villaggio: Billy Bolla 
 Fabiano Vagnarelli: Theo 
 Alessandro Haber: Marcov 
 Monica Bellucci: Melina 
 Leo Gullotta: Sidik 
 Anna Falchi: Elena 
 Luis Molteni  
 Angelo Orlando  
 Dong Mei Xiao  
 Pietro Ghislandi 
 Néstor Garay 
 Maurizio Nichetti

References

External links

1995 films
Films directed by Maurizio Nichetti
Italian adventure comedy films
1990s adventure comedy films
Films about animal rights
Films about whales
1995 comedy films
Films scored by Carlo Siliotto
1990s Italian-language films
1990s Italian films